Aboubacar Diallo (born 12 January 1976) is a Guinean boxer. He competed in the men's light welterweight event at the 1996 Summer Olympics.

References

1976 births
Living people
Guinean male boxers
Olympic boxers of Guinea
Boxers at the 1996 Summer Olympics
Place of birth missing (living people)
Light-welterweight boxers